The London and North Western Railway (LNWR) Class F was a class of 2-8-0 steam locomotives in service between 1906 and 1928.

History

George Whale had rebuilt 26 of the Class B compound 0-8-0s with the simple addition of a leading pony truck between 1904-1908 to what would from 1911 become Class E. However, from 1906 rebuilds of Class Bs were given a larger 5'2" diameter boilers, and ten were so rebuilt. To these was added a pair of rebuilds of Class Es (Nos 1038 in 1907 and 647 in 1908).

From 1921, the LNWR started rebuilding the Class Fs into Class G1 superheated 0-8-0s, and by the grouping of 1923, six had been rebuilt.  The remaining six were allocated the LMS numbers 9610-5.  The LMS rebuilt a further four to G1s, between 1923-5.  The remaining pair were withdrawn in 1927 and 1928 without being rebuilt.  None was preserved.

List of locomotives

LMS numbers in parentheses were not carried prior to rebuilding as G1 or withdrawal.

Notes

References

Further reading 
 Bob Essery & David Jenkinson An Illustrated Review of LMS Locomotives Vol. 2 Absorbed Pre-Group Classes Western and Central Divisions
 Edward Talbot, The London & North Western Railway Eight-Coupled Goods Engines
 Willie Yeadon, Yeadon's Compendium of LNWR Locomotives Vol 2 Goods Tender Engines

External links 

 LNWRS Webb page on the Class Fs

F
2-8-0 locomotives
Compound locomotives
Railway locomotives introduced in 1906
Standard gauge steam locomotives of Great Britain
1′D n4v locomotives